Kadaka may refer to several places in Estonia:

Kadaka, Rae Parish, village in Rae Parish, Harju County
Kadaka, Lääne County, village in Ridala Parish, Lääne County
Kadaka, Pärnu County, village in Varbla Parish, Pärnu County
Kadaka, Rapla County, village in Kohila Parish, Rapla County
Kadaka, Tallinn, subdistrict of Mustamäe, Tallinn

See also
Kataka (disambiguation)
Gadaka, town in Yobe State, Nigeria
Kadaga, village in Ādaži Municipality, Latvia